Bard-e Pahn-e Zilayi (also Romanized as Bard-e Pahn-e Zīlāyī; also known as Bard-e Pahn) is a village in Zilayi Rural District, Margown District, Boyer-Ahmad County, Kohgiluyeh and Boyer-Ahmad Province, Iran. At the 2006 census, its population was 955, in 184 families.

References 

Populated places in Boyer-Ahmad County